The 5th Indiana Volunteers, also known as the 5th Regiment Indiana Volunteer Infantry, was an infantry regiment that participated in the Mexican–American War. The unit was formed and commanded by future Kansas Senator James Henry Lane who had recently returned from commanding the 3rd Indiana Volunteer Infantry. Mahlon Dickerson Manson, later a member of Congress and a general in the Civil War served as captain of Company "I" in the regiment. The regiment remained in Mexico for the duration of the war.

References
 Perry, Oran, Adjutant-General, Indiana in the Mexican War, Indianapolis, 1908.

External links
 5th Regiment Indiana Volunteer Infantry (Mexican War) Field and Staff Officers

Indiana in the Mexican–American War
Military units and formations of the Mexican–American War